DECpc was a wide-ranging family of desktop computers, laptops, servers, and workstations sold by Digital Equipment Corporation. The vast majority in the family are based on x86 processors, although the APX 150 uses DEC's own Alpha processor. The line was DEC's first big break into the IBM PC compatible market.

Some entries in the desktop DECpc range were built by Olivetti S.p.A. and Tandy Corporation.

Line-up

 Explanatory notes
  Upgradable with snap-in processor/cache daughtercard
  Advanced Power Management–compliant

Desktops

Laptops

Workstations and servers

See also
 Digital HiNote, the successor to the DECpc line of laptops
 DECstation, concurrent line of workstations

References

DEC workstations
DEC laptops
Computer-related introductions in 1991
IBM PC compatibles